Ali-Akbar Saboury (born July 1960) is an Iranian biochemist and Distinguished Professor of Biophysical Chemistry at the University of Tehran.
He is known for his works on biothermodynamics, enzyme kinetics and calorimetry.

Books
 Chemical Thermodynamics, with Ali Akbar Mousavi Movahedi, Tehran: University of Tehran Press

References

External links
Personal Website

Living people
1960 births
Distinguished professors in Iran
Iranian physical chemists
Academic staff of the University of Tehran
People from Kashmar
Iranian biophysicists
Iranian biochemists